Axel Dorothée Marc Daeseleire (born 26 October 1968) is a Belgian actor. He is best known for his portrayal of Jan Verplancke in Belgian television series Matroesjka's, and movies such as Team Spirit.

Filmography
Ad Fundum (1993, film)
She Good Fighter (1995, film)
Nonkel Jef (1995, TV)
Thuis (1996, TV)as Robbe
Terug naar Oosterdonk (1997, TV) as Tuur
Diamant (1997, TV)
Dief (1997, film) as Frans Van Reeth
Flikken (1999-2003, TV) as Ben Vanneste
Team Spirit (2000, film) as Franky Leemans
Dennis (2002, TV) as Dennis Denissen
Team Spirit 2 (2003, film) as Franky Leemans
Kinderen Van Dewindt (2005, TV) as Bart Dewindt
De Indringer (2005) as Wes Moons
Matroesjka's (2005, TV) as Jan Verplancke
Kinderen Van Dewindt (2006, TV) as Bart Dewindt
De Hel van Tanger (2006, film) as Wim Moreels
Windkracht 10 - Koksijde Rescue (2006) as Koen
Kinderen Van Dewindt (2007, TV) as Bart Dewindt
Matroesjka's 2 (2007, TV) as Jan Verplancke
Vermist - De Serie (2008, TV) as Eric Coppens
LouisLouise (2008, 2009, TV) as Louis De Roover & Jeroen
Goesting (2010, TV)
Vermist - De Serie II (2010, TV) as Eric Coppens
Wolven (2012, TV) as Thomas Verhaege
Wolf (Voorjaar 2010, film)
Zot van A. (2010, film)
Witse (2011, TV-gastrol) as Gunther Selleslags'
Vermist - De Serie III+IV (2011-2012, TV) as Eric Coppens Groenten uit Balen (2011, film) as MarcelZone Stad (2011, TV-gastrol) as Patrick LibotteBlijf! (2011, film)
Aspe (2011, TV-gastrol) as Herman DardienPenoza (2017, TV) as Marcus VosGangsta (2018) as Stijn''

References
 

1968 births
Belgian male actors
Living people